is a Shinto shrine in the Hamochiiioka neighborhood of the city of Sado, Niigata. It is the ichinomiya of former Sado Province. The main festival of the shrine is held annually on the April 23.

Enshrined kami
The primary kami enshrined at Watatsu Jinja are:
 , god shipbuilding and sailing.
, sister of Isonotakeru
, sister of Isonotakeru
Beppyo shrines

History
Located on the island of Sado in the Sea of Japan, the history of Watatsu Shrine is uncertain, as the shrine was completely destroyed by a flood during the Kan'ei era (1624-1643) of the Edo Period. According to shrine tradition, it was founded by the semi-legendary Kofun period Emperor Chūai (reigned 192–200 AD). Its name appears in the Engishiki records compiled in 927 AD, but only as a minor shrine. It was destroyed by a flood in 1470, and rebuilt by the Honma clan, who were rulers of Sado island, in 1472. The shrine appears to have been destroyed repeatedly by floods in 1493, 1533 and 1593, and was merged in 1493 with a  nearby Hachiman shrine.

Each year in late-April, horseback archery (yabusame) takes place at the branch shrine in the town of Hamochi.

The shrine is located about 15 minutes by car from Ogi Port.

Gallery

See also
 List of Shinto shrines in Japan
 Ichinomiya

References

External links

Niigata Prefecture Kanko Navi 
Sado tourist information 

Shinto shrines in Niigata Prefecture
Sado, Niigata
Sado Province
Ichinomiya